Paraglaciecola hydrolytica is a Gram-negative, hydrolytic, aerobic and rod-shaped bacterium from the genus of Paraglaciecola which has been isolated from eelgrass from Zealand in Denmark.

References

External links
Type strain of Paraglaciecola hydrolytica at BacDive -  the Bacterial Diversity Metadatabase

Bacteria described in 2017
Alteromonadales